Ladislav Falta (30 January 1936 – 18 December 2021) was a Czech sport shooter who competed in the 1964 Summer Olympics, in the 1968 Summer Olympics, and in the 1972 Summer Olympics. He won a silver medal in the rapid fire pistol event at the 1972 Summer Olympics.

He died on 18 December 2021, at the age of 85.

References

1936 births
2021 deaths
People from Opočno
Czech male sport shooters
ISSF pistol shooters
Olympic shooters of Czechoslovakia
Shooters at the 1964 Summer Olympics
Shooters at the 1968 Summer Olympics
Shooters at the 1972 Summer Olympics
Olympic silver medalists for Czechoslovakia
Olympic medalists in shooting
Medalists at the 1972 Summer Olympics
Sportspeople from the Hradec Králové Region
20th-century Czech people